Cian Kiely (born 27 December 1996) is an Irish Gaelic footballer who plays at club level with Ballincollig and at inter-county level with the Cork senior football team. He usually lines out as a defender.

Career

Kiely first came to sporting prominence playing basketball. He won an All-Ireland U-14 title with his club and also played on Cork and Munster U-14 and U-15 squads. Kiely concentrated on Gaelic football after earning selection on the various Cork development squads at underage level. In 2014 he enjoyed a hugely successful year, winning Munster and All-Ireland titles with Coláiste Choilm, playing for the Cork minor football team, and lining out on the Ballincollig club team that won their first ever Cork SFC title. Kiely's inter-county progression continued and he came on as a substitute when Cork were beaten by Mayo in the 2016 All-Ireland under-21 final. He joined the Cork senior football team in 2018. Kiely also captained University College Cork to the Sigerson Cup title in 2019.

Honours

Coláiste Choilm
All-Ireland Post-Primary Schools Senior B Football Championship: 2014
Munster Post-Primary Schools Senior B Football Championship: 2014

University College Cork
Sigerson Cup: 2019 (c)

Ballincollig
Cork Senior Football Championship: 2014

Cork
Munster Under-21 Football Championship: 2016

References

External link

Cian Kiely profile at the Cork GAA website

1996 births
Living people
UCC Gaelic footballers
Ballincollig Gaelic footballers
Cork inter-county Gaelic footballers